Lieutenant General Jagjit Singh Aurora,  (also Jagjit Singh Arora) (13 February 1916 – 3 May 2005) was an Indian Army General Officer who was the General Officer Commanding-in-Chief (GOC-in-C) Eastern Command during the third war with Pakistan in 1971. He organised and led the ground forces campaign in the Eastern Front of the war, which led to an overwhelming defeat of the combined Pakistan Armed Forces in East-Pakistan that led to the creation of Bangladesh.

As the General commanding the Indian and Bangladesh Forces in the Eastern theater, Gen Aurora received the surrender from the Governor of East Pakistan and Commander of the Eastern Command of the Pakistan Army, Lt Gen A. A. K. Niazi.

After retirement from the Indian Army, he joined Akali Dal and served as a Member of Parliament in the Rajya Sabha.

Early life
Jagjit Singh Aurora was born to a Sikh family in Kala Gujran, Jhelum District, Punjab, British India. He was the son of an engineer.

Army career
Aurora graduated from the Indian Military Academy in 1939 and was commissioned into the 1st Battalion, 2nd Punjab Regiment on 1 February. He saw action in the Burma Campaign during World War II.

After Independence and the ensuing Partition of India, he opted to join the Indian Army and was a commissioned officer in the Punjab Regiment during the Indo-Pakistani War of 1947. On 3 February 1957, he was promoted acting Brigadier and given command of an infantry brigade.

In May 1961, as BGS XXXIII Corps, Brigadier Aurora led a team of military officers and men sent by the Government of India on a reconnaissance mission to Bhutan. This later led to the establishment of the Indian Military Training Team in Bhutan.

As a brigadier, he fought in the Sino-Indian War in 1962. He was appointed a division commander on 21 February 1963, with a promotion to the rank of Major General on 20 June 1964. He was then appointed Director of Military Training (DMT) on 23 November 1964. He also participated in the Indo-Pakistani War of 1965.

On 6 June 1966, Aurora was appointed Deputy Chief of the Army Staff (DCOAS) with the acting rank of Lieutenant General, and was promoted substantive Lieutenant General on 4 August. He was then given command of a General Officer Commanding (GOC) of a corps on 27 April 1967.  On 8 June 1969, he was appointed the General Officer Commanding-in-Chief (GOC-in-C) Eastern Command.

East Pakistan

In March 1971, the Pakistan Army launched Operation Searchlight to curb the Bengali nationalist movement in East Pakistan. The operation resulted in commencement of the Bangladesh Liberation War which resulted in the Bangladesh genocide, including the systematic murder of Bengali intellectuals by the Pakistan Army. The ensuing violence led to almost 10 million Bengali refugees fleeing from East Pakistan into India.  A spontaneous Bengali guerrilla force, the Mukti Bahini, was formed in response. This force along with the newly formed Bangladesh Forces, consisting of Bengali defectors from the Pakistan Army under the command of General Bangabir MAG Osmani, were engaged in escalating hostilities with the Pakistani Army.

For the next nine months, with tensions escalating between India and Pakistan and anticipating possible hostilities, Aurora oversaw the logistical preparations of the Indian Army on the Eastern front, including the improvement of roads, communications and bridges, as well as the movement of 30,000 tons of supplies close to the border with East Pakistan.

At the outbreak of the war on 3 December 1971, as Eastern Army Commander, Gen. Aurora oversaw the Indian ground forces into battle in East Pakistan.  In a meticulously planned operation, forces under Aurora's command formed numerous small combat teams and launched a four-front attack with the strategy of confronting and defeating the Pakistani forces on selected fronts, while bypassing Pakistani forces on others. In under two weeks, his forces advanced from the Indian border to capture Dhaka, the capital of East Pakistan.

The Unified Commander of Pakistan Armed Forces's Eastern Military High Command, Lieutenant General Amir Abdullah Khan Niazi was forced to sign an unconditional Instrument of Surrender. The photograph of Niazi and Aurora at the signing of the Instruments of Surrender became an iconic image of the war, with The Guardian describing the scene as "the glum Pakistani officer bowed over his signature. The turbaned figure beside him, showing not a scrap of elation". The 90,000 Pakistani troops under Niazi's command surrendered to Gen Aurora as prisoners of war in what remains to date the largest surrender of soldiers since the Second World War. Pakistan lost almost  of its territory and 70 million of its people to the newly formed nation of Bangladesh.

Later life
Aurora was honoured with the Param Vishisht Seva Medal, the Padma Bhushan and the Bir Protik  for his role in the war. He retired from the Indian Army in 1973. Lt Gen JFR Jacob has written in his book An Odyssey in War And Peace that Gen. Aurora approached then Prime Minister Indira Gandhi for governorship of a state but she declined. Jacob also writes that Gen. and Mrs. Aurora were a regular part of the social life of Calcutta.

In 1984, Aurora  fiercely criticised the Indian National Congress leadership following Operation Blue Star, which was an operation by the then government of flushing out armed Sikh militants who had taken up positions inside the Golden Temple in Amritsar but also caused extensive damage to the holiest shrine of Sikhism. Subsequently, he spent several years as a member of parliament in the Rajya Sabha, the upper House of the Indian Parliament, for the Akali Dal, a political party.

Aurora was also an active member of the Citizen's Justice Committee which provided pro bono assistance to Sikh victims of the 1984 anti-Sikh riots.

Death
Jagjit Singh Aurora died on 3 May 2005, at age 89, in New Delhi. He was survived by a son and a daughter. After his death, the gratitude of Bangladesh to General Aurora was emphasized in a message to India, from Morshed Khan, the Bangladeshi Foreign Minister, stating: "Aurora will be remembered in the history of Bangladesh for his contribution during our war of liberation in 1971, when he led the allied forces."

The site of the Pakistani surrender, where Lt. Gen. Niazi signed the Instrument of Surrender with Lt. Gen. Aurora on 16 December 1971 has been converted into a national monument Swadhinata Stambha. The main attraction is the glass Stambha which is built on the precise location where the instrument of surrender was signed. The monument also includes an eternal flame, terracotta murals of martyrs and a body of water.

Dates of rank

See also
 Sam Manekshaw
 Bangladesh Liberation War

Notes

References

External links
 Chat with Jagjit Singh Aurora , Rediff.com

1916 births
2005 deaths
Sikh warriors
Indian Sikhs
Military personnel from Punjab, India
Indian military personnel of the Indo-Pakistani War of 1971
Generals of the Indo-Pakistani War of 1971
Generals of the Bangladesh Liberation War
Indian generals
People from Jhelum District
Punjabi people
Bangladesh Liberation War
British Indian Army officers
Recipients of the Padma Bhushan in civil service
Shiromani Akali Dal politicians
Rajya Sabha members from Punjab, India
St. Anthony's High School, Lahore alumni
Recipients of the Param Vishisht Seva Medal
Recipients of the Bir Protik